Martín Leandro Castrogiovanni (born October 21, 1981) is a retired Italian rugby union player. He was born in Paraná, Argentina, but qualified for Italy through his heritage. Castrogiovanni moved to Italy as a teenager and represented the Italian national team 119 times over 14 years.  In Italy he played for Calvisano between 2001 and 2006, before moving to England to play for Leicester Tigers where he played 145 games over seven seasons, winning four Premiership Rugby titles.  In 2013 he moved to Toulon where he won a Heineken Cup, before finishing his career with Racing 92 in Paris.

Career
He played for Ghial Calvisano, with whom he won the Italian championship in 2005. He then signed for Leicester Tigers and, after a successful 2006/07 season, was named Guinness Premiership player of the season. He wore the name "Castro" on his shirt rather than "Castrogiovanni".

Castrogiovanni made his international debut for the Italian national team on 8 June 8 2002, during the tour against the All Blacks, and became a regular in the national side. He played every game of Italy's 2004 Six Nations campaign and was a reliable member of their forward pack, being selected man of the match in the victory against Scotland. One of his most famous moments came in 2004, when, during the summer tour against Japan, he scored a hat-trick – a rarity for a prop forward. He led the national team for the game against Scotland during the 2012 Six Nations Championship, which Italy won 13-6, leading him to Tweet "Only unbeaten 6 Nations Captain".

Castrogiovanni and Marcos Ayerza signed three-year contract extensions with the Premiership champions in January 2008.
In 2011, after much speculation about a move to France, he declared "money isn't everything" and renewed his contract with Leicester Tigers. During his time at Leicester Castrogiovanni played in two victorious Premiership finals in 2010 and 2013 (the latter as a replacement).

During the 2008 Six Nations Championship, Castrogiovanni was Italy's top try scorer.

After seven years at Welford Road, he signed for French club Toulon for the 2013–14 season.
On 10 June 2015, Castrogiovanni signed for Top 14 rivals Racing 92 from the 2015-16 season.

While he helped lead Racing to their first-ever European club final in 2016, he was suspended by Racing for that particular match. He did not play in Racing's European Rugby Champions Cup semi-final against Leicester Tigers, telling the club that he was in Argentina attending to family matters. However, he was instead spotted in Las Vegas partying with players from Parisian football club Paris Saint-Germain, including superstar Zlatan Ibrahimović, with photos of the group appearing in multiple French publications. The club indicated that it would take legal action against Castrogiovanni.

Personal life
Castrogiovanni is co-owner of an Italian restaurant in Leicester, Timo (Italian for 'thyme'). He speaks four languages: his native Spanish, Italian, English and French.

References

External links
6 Nations profile
 Martin Castrogiovanni on LeicesterTigers.com
 Martin Castrogiovanni on ERCrugby.com
 Martin Castrogiovanni on rwc2003.irb.com
 Timo Restaurant link
 

1981 births
Living people
People from Paraná, Entre Ríos
Argentine rugby union players
Italian rugby union players
Argentine people of Italian descent
Italian sportspeople of Argentine descent
Leicester Tigers players
Rugby Calvisano players
RC Toulonnais players
Rugby union props
Italy international rugby union players
Expatriate rugby union players in France
Expatriate rugby union players in England
People of Sicilian descent
Sportspeople from Entre Ríos Province